Atlanta Blackhawks was an American soccer team based in Atlanta, Georgia, United States. Founded in 2009, the team played in the USL Premier Development League (PDL), the fourth tier of the American Soccer Pyramid, in the Southeast Division of the Southern Conference. The franchise folded at the end of the 2010 season and left the league thereafter.

The team played its home games in the stadium at Alpharetta High School in nearby Alpharetta, Georgia. The team's colors were black and white.

History
The Blackhawks joined the PDL in 2009, and played their first ever game on May 9, 2009, away at Mississippi Brilla. The Blackhawks lost game 2–1, with the first goal in franchise history being scored by Babayele Sodade.

Players

Final roster
This list is a historical record of the final group of players on the last Blackhawks roster for their final game in August 2010.

Notable former players

This list of notable former players comprises players who went on to play professional soccer after playing for the team in the Premier Development League, or those who previously played professionally before joining the team.

  Blake Brettschneider
  Alex Caskey
  Troy Cole
  Sean Johnson
  Wilfrid Loizeau
  Long Tan
  Carl Woszczynski

Year-by-year

Coaches
  Massoud Roushandel (2009–2010)
  Trent Orndorf GK Coach (2009-2010)

References

External links
Official Site
Official PDL site

Association football clubs established in 2009
Association football clubs disestablished in 2010
USL League Two teams
B
2009 establishments in Georgia (U.S. state)
2010 disestablishments in Georgia (U.S. state)